Zoheyri-ye Olya (also Romanized as Z̧oheyrī-ye ‘Olyā; also known as Cham Gerdāb and Z̧oheyrī) is a village in Rudbar Rural District, Central District, Sirvan County, Ilam Province, Iran. At the 2006 census, its population was 115, in 29 families. The village is populated by Kurds.

References 

Populated places in Sirvan County
Kurdish settlements in Ilam Province